Georgia Hardstark (born June 8, 1980) is an American television host and podcast personality. She is the co-host of the true crime-comedy podcast My Favorite Murder along with comedian Karen Kilgariff. In 2018, Hardstark and Kilgariff co-founded the Exactly Right Podcast Network. Together, Hardstark and Kilgariff also wrote a joint memoir published in May 2019 called Stay Sexy and Don't Get Murdered.

Hardstark initially achieved notoriety while collaborating with Alie Ward on Cooking Channel programs Tripping Out with Alie & Georgia, Unique Sweets, and Classy Ladies, as well as the Feral Audio podcast Slumber Party with Alie & Georgia.

Early life 
Hardstark was born in Irvine, California, to parents Martin and Janet Hardstark. She has two older siblings, Asher and Leah. At age 5, her parents divorced. Growing up, Hardstark lived with her mother, while her father had custody every other weekend and two weeks out of the summer.

She is quite open about her past struggles growing up. At age 13, she started regularly doing meth and developed an eating disorder. One day, she was caught doing meth at school and was sent to rehab. She spent two weeks there, including her 14th birthday. After being discharged, she started using again but quit on her own, crediting Ray Bradbury's book The Martian Chronicles as what saved her.

Hardstark graduated high school in 1998 and promptly moved to Los Angeles to live with her grandmother. She attended beauty school for three months before dropping out. She then attended community college for a while before discovering blogging and decided to drop out of college and quit her receptionist job to pursue a career in entertainment.

Career

Hardstark and Ward  

In 2009, while still working at her receptionist job, Hardstark and her friend, Alie Ward, created a drink called the McNuggetini. She blogged about it on a website called This Recording, and shortly after, Hardstark and Ward recorded an instructional video on how to make the drink. According to Hardstark, after the video blew-up on YouTube, someone from the Cooking Channel sent the pair a Facebook message asking if they would record more instructional cocktail videos online. Given that message, Hardstark quit her receptionist job to pursue this new career path.

The pair appeared on shows such as Drinks with Alie and Georgia, Unique Sweets, and the web series Classy Ladies with Alie Ward and Georgia Hardstark. They were in the travel series Tripping Out with Alie and Georgia and Food's Greatest Hits.

In October 2016, their book, Vintage Cocktails with a Twist: 75 Traditional and Reinvented Drinks, was released by Page Street Publishing.

Hardstark co-hosted a podcast with Ward called Slumber Party with Alie & Georgia, through Feral Audio. In 2016, the series began airing on Fullscreen. The last episode was posted on January 18, 2017. The pair have not formally acknowledged the end of the show nor the apparent abrupt end to their partnership.

Hardstark and Kilgariff  
In 2016, Hardstark and Karen Kilgariff co-created the podcast My Favorite Murder.

Beginning in May 2016, it achieved very high ratings on the iTunes comedy podcast rankings, appearing as high as #1. As of August 8, 2017, it was ranked #3 on the iTunes comedy charts. In its 2016 year-end issue, Entertainment Weekly ranked it the second best podcast of the year. The show was broadcast on the Feral Audio network until September 2017, when it moved to Midroll Media. In 2018, Hardstark and Kilgariff co-founded the podcast network Exactly Right, which now produces their podcast along with several others.

A joint memoir by Hardstark and Kilgariff, titled Stay Sexy and Don't Get Murdered, was released on May 28, 2019.

Personal life
In March 2016, she married comedian Vince Averill, best known for his podcast We Watch Wrestling. The couple resides in California along with their three cats, Mimi, Dottie, and Moses ("Moe")  and their dog, Cookie. They previously had another cat named Elvis who died in December 2020. Hardstark considered having children, but decided against it, as she has said on the My Favorite Murder podcast and when she was a guest on the Spermcast.

Hardstark is a public advocate of therapy. She has seen a therapist since she was six due to her parents' divorce. Hardstark has also gone to couples therapy with her husband and co-therapy with Karen Kilgariff to maintain a healthy work relationship and friendship. She has been diagnosed with generalized anxiety disorder, depression, ADHD, and OCD.

Filmography

References

External links

Alie and Georgia YouTube
AlieAndGeorgia.com
Cooking Channel profile
Q'ing & A'ing With Alie and Georgia! — Huffington Post interview

1980 births
Living people
21st-century American comedians
21st-century American women
American podcasters
American women comedians
American women podcasters
American women television personalities
People associated with true crime
People from Irvine, California
Television personalities from California